Transpiração Contínua Prolongada (Portuguese for "Prolonged Continuous Sweating") is the debut album by Brazilian alternative rock band Charlie Brown Jr., released on June 16, 1997 through Virgin Records. It was one of the band's many releases to be produced by the duo Rick Bonadio and Tadeu Patolla, and the latter's own band, Lagoa, made a guest appearance on the track "Escalas Tropicais" in one of their final credited works prior to their break-up. Other guest musicians include rappers P.MC and DJ Deco Murphy, famous for their partnership and their later work on hip hop group Jigaboo.

According to the band's guitarist, Marcão, in a 2017 interview following the album's 20th anniversary, its name was an allusion to all the hard work they endured until they were able to record it.

Transpiração Contínua Prolongada spawned five hit singles and, despite initial mixed reception at the time of its release, it was a commercial success, selling over 250,000 copies and getting a Platinum certification by Pro-Música Brasil. As of 2013, the album had sold over 650,000 copies overall. Eight years later, "Aquela Paz" was re-recorded for their album Imunidade Musical.

The album was re-released twice; in 2013 by EMI, following the death of vocalist Chorão, and in 2017 by Universal Music, in a double-disc 20th-anniversary deluxe edition. The second disc serves as a greatest hits album, containing some of the band's most well known singles throughout their career.

Critical reception
In a retrospective review of the band's discography, Anderson Nascimento of Galeria Musical gave Transpiração Contínua Prolongada a positive review, rating it with 4 stars out of 5. He praised the band's originality, heavy sound and attitude. Conversely, a contemporary review by Cláudio Luís de Souza for newspaper Diário do Grande ABC from June 6, 1999 called the album's sonority (and the band's overall) "derivative" and criticized Chorão's songwriting as "crude and silly".

Track listing

Personnel

Charlie Brown Jr. 
 Chorão: vocals
 Champignon: bass guitar, backing vocals, beatboxing
 Thiago Castanho: electric guitar, backing vocals
 Marcão: electric guitar
 Renato Pelado: drums

Additional musicians 
 Rick Bonadio: electric guitar in "Aquela Paz", solo guitar in "Quinta-Feira", sampler in "Charlie Brown Jr."
 Tadeu Patolla/Lagoa: arrangements in "Escalas Tropicais"
 P.MC: rapping in "Lombra"
 DJ Deco Murphy: scratches in "Lombra" and "Charlie Brown Jr."

Production 
 Rodrigo Castanho: mixing
 Mário Fontes: cover art
 Shin Shikuma: photography

Certifications

References

1997 debut albums
Virgin Records albums
Albums produced by Rick Bonadio
Charlie Brown Jr. albums